The Glenmorgan Branch is a railway line in south west Queensland, Australia. It opened in a series of sections between 1908 and 1931. It was intended to reach Surat but construction ceased during the 1930s depression and never recommenced.

History

After the Western Line from Brisbane opened beyond Dalby in the 1870s and the South Western Line passed beyond Warwick in the early 1900s, there was agitation for a service west from Dalby towards Tara.  An 84 kilometre extension between the two towns was approved by parliament in April 1908.   There was some delay in construction as completion of the Haden and Cooyar branch lines was given priority.

The first section of the line opened as far as Kumbarilla on 8 September 1911 including stops at:

Dalby
Natcha (approx ) serving the Dalby Butter Factory
Yumborra added in 1956
 Nandi
 Kupunn
 Duleen
 Ducklo
 Gulera
Kumbarilla

On 4 October 1911, the line opened to Tara, including stops at:

 Weranga
 Bungybah
 Goranba
 Perthton
 Tara

A mixed train left Dalby three days a week at noon for the 4¼ hour journey to Tara leaving again the next morning at 11.30am for the return trip.

Slow progress west

An 80-kilometre extension to Surat was approved by parliament in December 1914 to service dairy and sheep farms en route. The line never reached Surat but four short stages opened progressively as far as Glenmorgan over the ensuing 17 years.  Construction began but was suspended between 1916 and 1923. On 24 August 1925, the line was extended to The Gums with stops at:

 Tullagrie
 South Glen
 Cabawin
The Gums

Two of the three weekly trains travelled the extra distance. Two short stages were opened to:

 Hannaford on 28 June 1926 
 Meandarra on 2 July 1927

From 1928, a rail motor service ran twice a week to Tara and later to Meandarra.

Another short extension took the line a further 22 kilometres with stops at:

 an unnamed stop
Glenmorgan opened on 12 December 1931.

The terminus was renamed Glenmorgan in honour of Godfrey Morgan the Railways Minister between 1929 and 1932.  Streets in the town were named after his family and he was also honoured with the naming of Morganville a railway terminus south-west of Bundaberg.

A twice-weekly goods train and a similar rail motor service operated between Dalby and Glenmorgan.  Grain gradually accounted for much of the traffic and special grain services became commonplace.  Road transport took over transport of general goods to the point where only seasonal grain traffic remains and then only as far as Meandarra.

The line beyond Meandarra was closed to block trains on 26 June 2013 and remains "booked out of use" as of 2022.

Contemporary line standards
The maximum grade is 1 in 44 (~2.3%) and the minimum curve is 400m radius. The line currently is laid with 41 & 30 kg/m rail, 25% steel sleepers and a 15.75 tonne axle load, except for west of Meandarra, which was 21 kg/m with a 10 tonne axle load.

The line speed is 60 km/h to Tara, 40 km/h to Meandarra and was 30 km/h to Glenmorgan.

References

External links
 1925 map of the Queensland railway system

See also

Rail transport in Queensland

Railway lines in Queensland
Railway lines opened in 1911
Darling Downs
1911 establishments in Australia